Saoirse is the Irish language word for "freedom" and may refer to:

 Saoirse (given name), an Irish female given name
 Saoirse Irish Freedom, the monthly organ of Republican Sinn Féin
 Saoirse na hÉireann, a small Irish republican paramilitary group
 Saoirse (horse), foaled 1996, Canadian champion racehorse
 Saoirse Abu, foaled 2005, American-bred thoroughbred racehorse and broodmare
 MV Saoirse, a ship participating in Freedom Flotilla II